Inês Pedrosa (born 15 August 1962) is a Portuguese journalist, novelist, short story writer, children's writer and playwright. She was director of the Casa Fernando Pessoa. Her novels have also been published in Brazil, Croatia, Ukraine, Germany, Italy and Spain.

Works

Mais Ninguém Tem (1991, children's short story)
A Instrução dos Amantes (1992, novel)
Nas Tuas Mãos (1997, novel)
Fazes-me Falta (pt) (2002)
Fica Comigo Esta Noite (pt) (2003)
12 Mulheres e 1 Cadela (2005, play)
A Eternidade e o Desejo ( 2005, novel) 
Os Íntimos ( 2010, novel) 
Dentro de Ti Ver o Mar ( 2012, novel) 
Desamparo ( 2015, novel) 
Desnorte ( 2016, short-stories)
O Processo Violeta ( 2019, novel)

Awards
Revelation Award from the Clube de Jornalistas (1985)
Journalism Award for Mulheres magazine (1985)
Sampaio Bruno Award from the Clube de Jornalistas do Porto (1992)
Prémio Máxima da Literatura for Nas Tuas Mãos
Prémio Máxima de Literatura for "Os Íntimos"

References

External links
 

1962 births
20th-century Portuguese women writers
21st-century Portuguese women writers
People from Coimbra
Portuguese journalists
Portuguese short story writers
Portuguese women short story writers
Portuguese children's writers
Portuguese women dramatists and playwrights
Portuguese women novelists
Portuguese women journalists
Living people
20th-century short story writers
21st-century short story writers
20th-century Portuguese novelists
21st-century Portuguese novelists
20th-century Portuguese dramatists and playwrights
21st-century Portuguese dramatists and playwrights